Eunyctibora is a genus of cockroaches within the family Ectobiidae, with 5 currently assigned species.

Species 

 Eunyctibora bicolor 
 Eunyctibora crassicornis 
 Eunyctibora magnifica 
 Eunyctibora nigrocincta 
 Eunyctibora omissa

References 

Cockroach genera